William Morris Carroll (May 1, 1926 – December 4, 2009) was an American pole vaulter and later coach of the track and field and cross country teams at the University of Oklahoma.

Athletic career
Carroll was a world-ranked pole vaulter at the University of Oklahoma.  He was the number 7 pole vaulter in the world in 1949, and moved up to the number six position in 1950.  Those same years, he was ranked sixth and then fifth in the US. Carroll tied for second place at the NCAA Track and Field Championships in 1949 with a height of 14 feet.

Carroll also enjoyed success as a high school athlete, winning the Oklahoma state high school championship in 1944.  While competing in collete, he set the record at the 1950 Kansas Relays with a vault of 14 feet 5 inches and set the record for the Big 7 Outdoor championship.

Coaching career

Southwestern
Carroll was the 14th head football coach at the Southwestern College in Winfield, Kansas, serving for seasons, from 
1952 to 1953, compiling a record of 2–15–1.

Oklahoma
Carroll was an assistant and later head coach at the University of Oklahoma for the track and field and cross country teams from 1959 until 1964.

Head coaching record

Football

References

External links
 

1926 births
2009 deaths
American male pole vaulters
Oklahoma Sooners men's track and field athletes
Oklahoma Sooners track and field coaches
Southwestern Moundbuilders football coaches
College cross country coaches in the United States
People from Okfuskee County, Oklahoma
Track and field athletes from Oklahoma